Quercus crassipes is a species of oak tree. It is widespread across much of Mexico from Sonora and Hidalgo south to Chiapas.

References

External links
 photo of herbarium specimen collected in Nuevo León in 1978

crassipes
Endemic oaks of Mexico
Trees of Puebla
Plants described in 1809
Taxa named by Aimé Bonpland
Flora of the Sierra Madre Oriental
Flora of the Sierra Madre de Oaxaca
Flora of the Sierra Madre del Sur
Flora of the Trans-Mexican Volcanic Belt